This list of presidents of the University of Oklahoma includes all fifteen individuals who have served as the president of the University of Oklahoma since the institution was founded in 1890.

The University of Oklahoma is a public university, created and supported by the state of Oklahoma, and it is a designated research university.  The campus of the university is located in Norman, and it has facilities in Oklahoma City and Tulsa.

The current president of the University of Oklahoma is Joseph Harroz Jr., who replaced James L. Gallogly as president of the University on May 12, 2019, as interim president. On May 9, 2020, Harroz was named Gallogly's replacement. Using the university's counting method, Harroz is the fifteenth president of the university.

References

Oklahoma
University of Oklahoma